was a video game distribution service for Super Famicom or Game Boy operated by Nintendo that ran exclusively in Japan from late 1996 until February 2007. The service allowed users to download Super Famicom or Game Boy titles onto a special flash memory cartridge for a lower price than that of a pre-written ROM cartridge.

At its 1996 launch, the service initially offered only Super Famicom titles. Game Boy titles began being offered on March 1, 2000. The service was ultimately discontinued on February 28, 2007.

History

Background
During the market lifespan of the Famicom, Nintendo developed the Disk System, a floppy disk drive peripheral with expanded RAM which allowed players to use re-writable disk media called "disk cards" at Disk Writer kiosks. The system was relatively popular but suffered from issues of limited capacity. However, Nintendo did see a market for an economical re-writable medium due to the popularity of the Disk System.

Nintendo's first dynamic flash storage subsystem for the Super Famicom is the Satellaview, a peripheral released in 1995 that facilitated the delivery of a set of unique Super Famicom games via the St.GIGA satellite network.

Release
The Super Famicom version of Nintendo Power was released in late 1996.

The Game Boy Nintendo Power was originally planned to launch on November 1, 1999; however, due to the 1999 Jiji earthquake disrupting production in Taiwan, it was delayed until March 1, 2000.

Nintendo Power was discontinued in February 2007, with kiosks being removed from stores.

Usage

When this was on the market in the 1990s, the user would first purchase the RAM cartridge, then bring it to a store featuring a Nintendo Power kiosk. The user selects games to be copied to the cartridge and the store provides a printed copy of the manual. Game prices varied, with older games being relatively cheap, and newer games and Nintendo Power exclusives being more expensive.

The proprietary medium made illicit duplication much more difficult than a standard format such as a floppy disk.

Technical details
Each cartridge's flash ROM is divided internally into eight blocks. Unless an 8-block game is loaded onto the cartridge, however, one block is reserved for the game selection menu, leaving only seven blocks for games.

In addition, each cartridge has a small amount of SRAM for saved games, which is divided into sixteen blocks. Games are rounded up in capacity; for example, a 10 megabit Super Famicom game needs three flash ROM blocks totaling 12 megabits, and a Game Boy game that needs 100 kilobits of save space would need two SRAM blocks totaling 128 kilobits.

Nintendo Power has no Super Famicom enhancement chips such as the Super FX, so such games are incompatible.

Super Famicom

 MSRP – 
 Onboard flash ROM (for game data) – 32 megabits total (4 megabits/block × 8 blocks)
 Onboard SRAM (for game saves) – 256 kilobits total (16 kilobits/block × 16 blocks)

Game Boy

 MSRP – 
 Onboard flash ROM for game data, 8 megabits (1 megabit/block × 8 blocks)
 Onboard SRAM for saved games, 1024 kilobits (64 kilobits/block × 16 blocks)

Reception
When the Nintendo Power for Super Famicom launched, it was perceived by the press as being in part an effort to free up retailer shelf space for more Nintendo 64 products.

List of games

Super Famicom 

Third party games
Akagawa Jirou: Majotachi no Nemuri
Columns
Dōkyūsei 2
Mega Man 7
Mega Man X
Ring ni Kakero
Super Family Gerende
Tamagotchi Town

Game Boy

References

External links
SFC game list on Nintendo's website (Japanese) on Wayback Machine
GB game list on Nintendo's website (Japanese) on Wayback Machine

Game Boy accessories
Super Nintendo Entertainment System accessories
Japan-only video game hardware
Online video game services
Video games developed in Japan